Frontenac Secondary School is a high school in the west-end of Kingston, Ontario, Canada, operated by the Limestone District School Board. Its sports teams play under the nickname "Frontenac Falcons".

History
Frontenac Secondary School was founded in 1957 as Collins Bay High School and adopted its current name in 1964. Frontenac's enrollment is around 1,200 students. In 2006, construction began on a major extension which includes a new library, a media room, an elevator, and several additional computer labs and classrooms.

Varsity Athletics
Frontenac is known nationally for its athletics program.  Its mascot is the Falcon. From the 1970s and to the present day, the school has had one of the most dominant high school American football programs in Ontario and one of the most accomplished athletic programs in Canada, achieving a national high school ranking in football in the 2000s. The senior Falcons have been coached by Pat McMenamin, Jack Aldridge and Berk Brean. The Falcon football program has produced numerous Canadian Interuniversity Sport players, All Canadians and Vanier Cup participants and champions including the quarterback Warren Goldie who led the University of Western Ontario mustangs to the Vanier Cup in 1994.

The Falcon women's basketball program was most dominant in the 1980 and 1990s under coach Tim McCue, winning numerous city and regional championships and also provincial medals. During the 1990s and 2000s, the men's basketball program enjoyed notable success with city, regional and provincial titles. The men's team enjoyed particular success in 2003 and 2004, winning the 2003 AAA OFSAA gold medal and the 2004 AAAA OFSAA bronze medal. These teams were coached by Suche James and included the future CIS All-Stars Robert Saunders and Stuart Turnbull.

Frontenac also has strong programs in volleyball including ten consecutive city championships for the men's junior program in the late 1980s and early 1990s. Frontenac has also been a force in track and field, producing athletes who have participated in Canada's national team in the Olympic Games.

Both the Junior and Senior Facons were the dominant football teams in the late 1970s and early 1980s by winning 4 consecutive Kingston City championships. In 2001, the Falcons championship team completely swept the Kingston area during regular-season play. No school scored against the Falcons until their first National Capital Bowl win against St. Mark Catholic School in the Skydome in Toronto. The team won the National Capital Bowl that season, winning a perfect defensive record during the regular season, city play-offs, and the Eastern Ontario final, and culminating with a 29–20 win during the National Capital Bowl played the Rogers Centre (then Skydome). The following year, with a squad full of returning OFSAA championship players, the school won another OFSAA Title at the National Capital Bowl with a convincing 56–6 over favourite Ashbury College. In 2006, Frontenac's football team again produced dominance in the Kingston area and reached the National Capital Bowl only to lose in a 10-8 match against the St. Mark Catholic School Lions. On 4 December 2007, the Frontenac senior football  returned to the National Capital Bowl Championship and won at Varsity Stadium in Toronto, defeating Crestwood Secondary School of Peterborough by a score of 15–10, the third National Capital Bowl victory for Frontenac in the seven years. The Frontenac Falcons defended the National Capital Bowl title on 3 December 2008 by defeating Crestwood again with a score of 36–1 at the Rogers Centre in Toronto, making it Frontenacs second back-to-back National Capital Bowl. On 27 November 2011, the Falcons returned to the Rogers Centre and defeated the Crestwood Mustangs again, 49–11, Frontenac's fifth National Capital Bowl title since the bowl series' inception in 2000. For their accomplishments, head coaches Mike Doyle and Doug Johnston received the Berk Brean Trophy for High School Coach of The Year from Queen's University. Berk Brean was one of the original senior football coaches at Frontenac Secondary. In terms of Kingston Area Football programs and quality, Frontenac's senior football team has won seven of the last twelve Kingston Area Senior Football Championships (2001–2012) and of those seven championships won six National Capital Bowls after winning Easter Ontario Finals.

Every year (with the exceptions of 2000,2003 and 2008 seasons), Frontenac competes in a tournament with Bayridge Secondary School entitled the Banana Bowl, where senior and junior football teams compete for a trophy and a stuffed banana. Frontenac has won this tournament every year since 1995.

Frontenac has had a hockey program for the past few years. It has represented EOSSAA at OFSAA twice and has always been a contender in league and tournament play. The team has traveled all over Ontario to play in tournaments.

Frontenac to date holds the most city, regional and provincial titles in Kingston over its close rivals Regiopolis-Notre Dame Catholic Secondary School, Holy Cross Catholic Secondary School and Bayridge Secondary School. The Frontenac Falcons enjoyed success as usual in 2017–2018.

Music
Throughout the 1970s, 1980s and 1990s, Frontenac was known for its music program which won numerous competitions and festivals throughout Canada. Many music graduates from this time went on to careers as professional players, recording artists and music educators. The rock group the Blushing Brides was formed at Frontenac.
Until 2005, there was a symphonic band, a concert band, a strings ensemble, a jazz ensemble and a choir. In the 1980s, it was one of few schools to have an orchestra. 
Over the last few years Frontenac has seen a rebirth in the music program. It has a recreation band and competition band which include string players. There is also a strong composition element at the school.

Other programs
The school is well known for its mathematics department, one of few in the region to offer the Advanced Placement calculus and computer science programs.

Every year, Frontenac has junior and senior teams that compete in the Canadian game show Reach for the Top. In 1998–99, the senior team was the national champion. The team has also performed well in recent years, even qualifying for and competing in the American game show Whiz Quiz. In 2007 and 2008, the senior REACH team was the international Whiz Quiz champions, and in 2006 and 2007, they attended the provincial REACH Championships.

Notable alumni
Rob Bagg, CFL player
Wayne Cashman, Canadian retired professional ice hockey player, former NHL head coach, currently an assistant coach of the Boston Bruins.
Taylor Hall, Boston Bruins hockey player and number 1 draft pick in the 2010 NHL Entry Draft
Dee Sterling, CFL player
John Tripp, professional ice hockey player, playing in German League.
Dylan Wykes, long-distance runner, qualified for the marathon in the 2012 Summer Olympics in London.
Rick Smith, Canadian retired professional hockey player for the Boston Bruins
Amanda Leveille, professional hockey player, two-time Isobel Cup champion, and NWHL all-time record holder in wins

See also
List of high schools in Ontario

References

External links
 
 School's athletics website

Educational institutions established in 1957
High schools in Kingston, Ontario
1957 establishments in Ontario